Penistone FM is a community radio station based in Penistone, South Yorkshire in the United Kingdom. The station is operated by Penistone Community Radio Limited and was awarded its five-year community broadcast licence in December 2007. Penistone FM launched on Saturday 6 June 2009 at 09:57.

History

Penistone FM was formed in 2005 as a not-for-profit community radio station staffed by a team of volunteers. In June 2007, The station applied to the industry regulator Ofcom for an FM community radio licence. It was awarded an AM licence in December 2007, and later changed to FM when a frequency became available. A four-week period of test transmissions began on Saturday 9 May 2009 with Let Me Entertain You by Robbie Williams as the first song played. The station officially launched on Saturday 6 June 2009 at 09:57. The official launch song was Greatest Day by Take That.

On Air

Penistone FM broadcasts on 95.7 FM and online. The FM signal is broadcast from an eight-metre high mast at Hoylandswaine and although of low power at only 20 watts, the station can be heard widely in and around North, West and South Yorkshire.

Content on the station includes a variety of genres, with more specialist programming on evenings and at weekends, with Country, Brass, Alternative, Soul and Dance being some of the genres covered.

References

External links 
 
 Penistone FM's local news website

Community radio stations in the United Kingdom
Penistone
Radio stations in Yorkshire